The Alger Lakes are a group of lakes in Mono County, California, in the United States.

The Alger Lakes were named for John Alger of the United States Geological Survey.

See also
List of lakes in California

References

Lakes of California
Lakes of Mono County, California
Lakes of Northern California